The American silver perch, Bairdiella chrysoura, is an American fish. Widespread on the eastern seaboard, the silver perch is commonly caught by inshore anglers in search of larger species.

Description 
The American silver perch has a moderately large, obliquely rising terminal mouth. The lower jaw projects further than the upper jaw. The chin does not bear a barbel but has three pairs of mental pores (the arrangement of the barbels and under-chin pores provides a means to distinguish between different members of the family Sciaenidae). The preopercle, the bony plate just in front of the operculum, bears a few spines set at an angle. The dorsal fin has ten to eleven spines and nineteen to twenty-three soft rays. The anal fin has two spines, the second of which is sharp and more than two thirds the length of the first soft ray, and eight to ten soft rays.
 This fish has a two-chambered swim bladder which is connected to the inner ear. It has good hearing, on a par with the goldfish which is renowned for its auditory ability. Its general color is silvery, greenish, or bluish on the dorsal surface and silvery or yellowish on the underside. The fins are yellowish or greyish.

Silver perch are similar in appearance to the sand seatrout or silver seatrout, two closely related species of weakfish. Seatrout usually have 1 or 2 prominent canine teeth at the tip of upper jaw and do not have chin pores.

Distribution and habitat
Silver perch are native to the east coast of the United States. Its range extends from New York to Mexico. They are found inshore in seagrass beds, tidal creeks and rivers, and marshes.

Behavior
Spawning takes place in shallow, saline portions of bays and other inshore areas, peaking between May and September. Silver perch mature by second or third year (by 6 inches). Adults eat crustaceans and small fishes. They may live to 6 years.

Fishing 
Silver perch are rarely targeted as game fish due to their small size, though they are considered good eating. They are most commonly caught as bycatch when fishing inshore or nearshore for species such as black drum and sheepshead. Silver perch are occasionally used as bait by fishermen.

Sources 

 Smithsonian Marine Station
 Florida Fish and Wildlife Conservation Commission

Sciaenidae
Fish described in 1802